Secondary hypertension (or, less commonly, inessential hypertension) is a type of hypertension which by definition is caused by an identifiable underlying primary cause. It is much less common than the other type, called essential hypertension, affecting only 5-10% of hypertensive patients. It has many different causes including endocrine diseases, kidney diseases, and tumors. It also can be a side effect of many medications.

Types

Kidney

Renovascular hypertension
It has two main causes: fibromuscular dysplasia and atherosclerosis of the renal artery resulting in stenosis.
 See main article at Renovascular hypertension.

Kidney
Other well known causes include diseases of the kidney. This includes diseases such as polycystic kidney disease which is a cystic genetic disorder of the kidneys, PKD, which is characterized by the presence of multiple cysts (hence, "polycystic") in both kidneys, can also damage the liver, pancreas, and rarely, the heart and brain.
It can be autosomal dominant or autosomal recessive, with the autosomal dominant form being more common and characterized by progressive cyst development and bilaterally enlarged kidneys with multiple cysts, with concurrent development of hypertension, chronic kidney disease and kidney pain. Or chronic glomerulonephritis which is a disease characterized by inflammation of the glomeruli, or small blood vessels in the kidneys.

Hypertension can also be produced by diseases of the renal arteries supplying the kidney. This is known as renovascular hypertension; it is thought that decreased perfusion of renal tissue due to stenosis of a main or branch renal artery activates the renin–angiotensin system.

Also, some renal tumors can cause hypertension.  The differential diagnosis of a renal tumor in a young patient with hypertension includes Juxtaglomerular cell tumor, Wilms' tumor, and renal cell carcinoma, all of which may produce renin.

Hypertension secondary to other renal disorders
 Chronic kidney disease
 Kidney disease / renal artery stenosis –  the normal physiological response to low blood pressure in the renal arteries is to increase cardiac output (CO) to maintain the pressure needed for glomerular filtration.
Here, however, increased CO cannot solve the structural problems causing renal artery hypotension, with the result that CO remains chronically elevated.
 Renal segmental hypoplasia (Ask-Upmark kidney)

Hypertension secondary to endocrine disorders
 Neurogenic hypertension – excessive secretion of norepinephrine and epinephrine which promotes vasoconstriction resulting from chronic high activity of the sympathoadrenal system, the sympathetic nervous system and the adrenal gland. The specific mechanism involved is increased release of the "stress hormones", epinephrine (adrenaline) and norepinephrine which increase blood output from the heart and constrict arteries. People with neurogenic hypertension respond poorly to treatment with diuretics as the underlying cause of their hypertension is not addressed.
 Pheochromocytoma – a tumor which results in an excessive secretion of norepinephrine and epinephrine which promotes vasoconstriction
 Hyperaldosteronism (Conn's syndrome)   – idiopathic hyperaldosteronism, liddle's syndrome (also called pseudoaldosteronism), glucocorticoid remediable aldosteronism
 Cushing's syndrome – an excessive secretion of glucocorticoids causes the hypertension
 Hyperparathyroidism
 Acromegaly
 Hyperthyroidism
 Hypothyroidism

Adrenal
A variety of adrenal cortical abnormalities can cause hypertension, In primary aldosteronism there is a clear relationship between the aldosterone-induced sodium retention and the hypertension.

Congenital adrenal hyperplasia, a group of autosomal recessive disorders of the enzymes responsible for steroid hormone production, can lead to secondary hypertension by creating atypically high levels of mineralocorticoid steroid hormones.  These mineralocorticoids cross-react with the aldosterone receptor, activating it and raising blood pressure.
 17 alpha-hydroxylase deficiency causes an inability to produce cortisol.  Instead, extremely high levels of the precursor hormone corticosterone are produced, some of which is converted to 11-Deoxycorticosterone (DOC), a potent mineralocorticoid not normally clinically important in humans.  DOC has blood-pressure raising effects similar to aldosterone, and abnormally high levels result in hypokalemic hypertension.
 11β-hydroxylase deficiency, aka apparent mineralocorticoid excess syndrome, involves a defect in the gene for 11β-hydroxysteroid dehydrogenase, an enzyme that normally inactivates circulating cortisol to the less-active metabolite cortisone.   At high concentrations cortisol can cross-react and activate the mineralocorticoid receptor, leading to aldosterone-like effects in the kidney, causing hypertension. This effect can also be produced by prolonged ingestion of liquorice (which can be of potent strength in liquorice candy), by causing inhibition of the 11β-hydroxysteroid dehydrogenase enzyme and likewise leading to secondary apparent mineralocorticoid excess syndrome. Frequently, if liquorice is the cause of the high blood pressure, a low blood level of potassium will also be present. Cortisol induced hypertension cannot be completely explained by the activity of Cortisol on Aldosterone receptors. Experiments show that treatment with Spironolactone (an inhibitor of the aldosterone receptor), does not prevent hypertension with excess cortisol. It seems that inhibition of nitric oxide synthesis may also play a role in cortisol induced hypertension.

Yet another related disorder causing hypertension is glucocorticoid remediable aldosteronism, which is an autosomal dominant disorder in which the increase in aldosterone secretion produced by ACTH is no longer transient, causing of primary hyperaldosteronism, the Gene mutated will result in an aldosterone synthase that is ACTH-sensitive, which is normally not. GRA appears to be the most common monogenic form of human hypertension.

Compare these effects to those seen in Conn's disease, an adrenocortical tumor which causes excess release of aldosterone, that leads to hypertension.

Another adrenal related cause is Cushing's syndrome which is a disorder caused by high levels of cortisol. Cortisol is a hormone secreted by the cortex of the adrenal glands. Cushing's syndrome can be caused by taking glucocorticoid drugs, or by tumors that produce cortisol or adrenocorticotropic hormone (ACTH). More than 80% of patients with Cushing's syndrome develop hypertension., which is accompanied by distinct symptoms of the syndrome, such as central obesity, lipodystrophy, moon face, sweating, hirsutism and anxiety.

Neuroendocrine tumors are also a well known cause of secondary hypertension. Pheochromocytoma (most often located in the adrenal medulla) increases secretion of catecholamines such as epinephrine and norepinephrine, causing excessive stimulation of adrenergic receptors, which results in peripheral vasoconstriction and cardiac stimulation. This diagnosis is confirmed by demonstrating increased urinary excretion of epinephrine and norepinephrine and/or their metabolites (vanillylmandelic acid).

Other secondary hypertension
 Hormonal contraceptives
 Neurologic disorders
 Obstructive sleep apnea
 Liquorice (when consumed in excessive amounts)
 Scleroderma
 Neurofibromatosis
 Pregnancy: unclear cause.
 Cancers: tumours in the kidney can operate in the same way as kidney disease. More commonly, however, tumors cause inessential hypertension by ectopic secretion of hormones involved in normal physiological control of blood pressure.
 Drugs: In particular, alcohol, nasal decongestants with adrenergic effects, NSAIDs, MAOIs, adrenoceptor stimulants, and combined methods of hormonal contraception (those containing ethinylestradiol) can cause hypertension while in use.
 Heavy alcohol use
 Steroid use
 Nicotine use.
 Malformed aorta, slow pulse, ischemia: these cause reduced blood flow to the renal arteries, with physiological responses as already outlined.
 Coarctation of the aorta
 Atherosclerosis
 Anemia: unclear cause.
 Fever: unclear cause.
 White coat hypertension, that is, elevated blood pressure in a clinical setting but not in other settings, probably due to the anxiety some people experience during a clinic visit.
 Perioperative hypertension is development of hypertension just before, during or after surgery. It may occur before surgery during the induction of anesthesia; intraoperatively e.g. by pain-induced sympathetic nervous system stimulation; in the early postanesthesia period, e.g. by pain-induced sympathetic stimulation, hypothermia, hypoxia, or hypervolemia from excessive intraoperative fluid therapy; and in the 24 to 48 hours after the postoperative period as fluid is mobilized from the extravascular space. In addition, hypertension may develop perioperatively because of discontinuation of long-term antihypertensive medication.

Medication side effects
Certain medications, including NSAIDs (Motrin/Ibuprofen) and steroids can cause hypertension. Other medications include estrogens (such as those found in oral contraceptives with high estrogenic activity), certain antidepressants (such as venlafaxine), buspirone, carbamazepine, bromocriptine, clozapine, and cyclosporine.
High blood pressure that is associated with the sudden withdrawal of various antihypertensive medications is called rebound hypertension.  The increases in blood pressure may result in blood pressures greater than when the medication was initiated. Depending on the severity of the increase in blood pressure, rebound hypertension may result in a hypertensive emergency. Rebound hypertension is avoided by gradually reducing the dose (also known as "dose tapering"), thereby giving the body enough time to adjust to reduction in dose. Medications commonly associated with rebound hypertension include centrally-acting antihypertensive agents, such as clonidine and methyl-dopa.

Other herbal or "natural products" which have been associated with hypertension include Ephedra, St John's wort, and licorice.

Pregnancy
Few women of childbearing age have high blood pressure, up to 11% develop hypertension of pregnancy. While generally benign, it may herald three complications of pregnancy: pre-eclampsia, HELLP syndrome and eclampsia. Follow-up and control with medication is therefore often necessary.

Sleep disturbances
Another common and under-recognized cause of hypertension is sleep apnea, which is often best treated with nocturnal nasal continuous positive airway pressure (CPAP), but other approaches include the Mandibular advancement splint (MAS), UPPP, tonsillectomy, adenoidectomy, septoplasty, or weight loss.
Another cause is an exceptionally rare neurological disease called Binswanger's disease, causing dementia; it is a rare form of multi-infarct dementia, and is one of the neurological syndromes associated with hypertension.

Arsenic exposure
Because of the ubiquity of arsenic in ground water supplies and its effect on cardiovascular health, low dose arsenic poisoning should be inferred as a part of the pathogenesis of idiopathic hypertension. Idiopathic and essential are both somewhat synonymous with primary hypertension. Arsenic exposure has also many of the same signs of primary hypertension such as headache, somnolence,

confusion, proteinuria

visual disturbances, and nausea and vomiting

Potassium deficiency
Due to the role of intracellular potassium in regulation of cellular pressures related to sodium, establishing potassium balance has been shown to reverse hypertension.

Diagnosis
The ABCDE mnemonic can be used to help determine a secondary cause of hypertension
 A: Accuracy, Apnea, Aldosteronism
 B: Bruits, Bad Kidney
 C: Catecholamines, Coarctation of the Aorta, Cushing's Syndrome
 D: Drugs, Diet
 E: Erythropoietin, Endocrine Disorders

References

Kidney diseases
Hypertension